Nuttallochiton is a genus of chitons; the only one to have paired rather than fused gonads.

Species
There are three species:

References 

Mopaliidae
Chiton genera